Rafael María Baralt y Pérez (3 July 1810 - 4 January 1860) was a Venezuelan diplomat  and one of the country's most famed writers, philologists, and historians. He was the first Latin American to occupy a chair at the Real Academia Española. Born in Maracaibo on 3 July 1810, he suffered an untimely death in Madrid due to the stresses and aggravations suffered during services rendered to his beloved country of birth. 

Baralt was the son of  Miguel Antonio Baralt, who helped build the Baralt Theater in Maracaibo, and Ana Francisca Pérez, who was Dominican. He died on 4 January 1860, and is buried in the National Pantheon of Venezuela.

Books
 Resumen de la Historia de Venezuela (1840)
 Adiós a la Patria (1842).

External links
 

1810 births
1860 deaths
Venezuelan male writers
People from Maracaibo
Members of the Royal Spanish Academy
Venezuelan philologists
Burials at the National Pantheon of Venezuela
Venezuelan people of Dominican Republic descent